Le Talisman was a French Navy sloop built at Le Havre in 1862 which was used for geological, biological and hydrological exploration in the Atlantic Ocean and Mediterranean Sea at the end of the 19th century. It first served as a communications vessel ("aviso"), and was both sail and propeller driven.

In 1883 it was fitted out for scientific work under the direction of Professor Alphonse Milne-Edwards, equipped with a dredging winch with a capacity of 20 tons, and fitted to carry seven scientists together with a laboratory.

Among the expedition scientists were:
 Alphonse Milne-Edwards
 Henri Filhol
 Leopold de Folin
 Leon Valiant
 Louis-Alexandre Vincent
This cruise yielded finds from the deep sea and sea bottom such as the pelican eel, and the decapod, Ethusina talismani. One most important find was the discovery of the viability of micro-organisms at depths of 5 km below the surface (and consequently living at enormous pressures).

Publications from the expeditions
include:
 
 pp.134-138, pp.147-151, pp.161-164, pp. 182-186, pp. 198-202,

References

1862 ships
Ships of France
Ships built in France
Research vessels
Survey ships of the French Navy
Avisos of the French Navy